Fábio Nunes Fernandes (born 15 January 1980) is a Brazilian former football player.

Club statistics

References

External links

Vegalta Sendai

1980 births
Living people
Brazilian footballers
Brazilian expatriate footballers
Liga Portugal 2 players
Liga I players
J2 League players
Associação Chapecoense de Futebol players
Santa Cruz Futebol Clube players
Vegalta Sendai players
S.C. Beira-Mar players
Uberlândia Esporte Clube players
C.F. Estrela da Amadora players
CS Pandurii Târgu Jiu players
Expatriate footballers in Portugal
Expatriate footballers in Japan
Expatriate footballers in Romania
Brazilian expatriate sportspeople in Romania
Association football forwards
Footballers from Porto Alegre